Salvia hylocharis is a perennial plant that is native to Xizang and Yunnan provinces in China, growing on grassy slopes, forest margins, and streamsides at  elevation.

Notes

hylocharis
Flora of China